Chilonopsis blofeldi was a species of air-breathing land snails, terrestrial pulmonate gastropod mollusks in the family Achatinidae. This species was endemic to Saint Helena. It is now extinct.

References

blofeldi
Extinct gastropods
Taxa named by Henry Ogg Forbes
Gastropods described in 1852
Taxonomy articles created by Polbot